Jean Butez (born 8 June 1995) is a French professional footballer who plays for Belgian club Antwerp as a goalkeeper. A prospect of the Lille academy, Butez made his breakthrough with Mouscron and signed with Antwerp in 2020.

Career

Early career
Butez started playing football at FC Merris, the club from his home town of Merris. Two years later, he made the move to the Lille OSC academy, who had scouted him down during a futsal tournament in which he was named best goalkeeper. In the 2012–13 season, he gained his first playing minutes for Lille B in the CFA, the fourth tier in French football. After being relegated from the CFA with the club in 2015, he won the CFA 2 title a year later. In five seasons, he made 81 official appearances for Lille's second team. In the meantime, he occasionally was part of the first team of Lille, but he never made his professional debut.

Mouscron
For the 2017–18 season, Butez was sent on a one-season loan to Royal Excel Mouscron, Lille's former cooperation club. On the first match day of the Belgian First Division A, he immediately made a start against Oostende (0–1 win). On the second matchday, he received a red card against Charleroi in the 82nd minute for a handball outside of the penalty area. Logan Bailly took his place in goal on the third day matchday. Butez would only make eleven appearances for the Hainaut-based club that season. After Lille terminated his contract in the summer of 2018, Mouscron permanently signed him.

In the 2018–19 season, Butez left a strong impression as Mouscron won 23 out of a possible 27 points in the spring. In the winter of 2019, he was explicitly mentioned as a potential successor to Lovre Kalinić at Gent, and in February 2019 football analyst Stéphane Pauwels had him down as a transfer target at Lyon. After the regular season, he was also rumoured as a prospect Standard Liège and Anderlecht. In the summer of 2019, he seemed like a serious option for Club Brugge, but when Mouscron had an asking price of €6 million and Club could sign Liverpool and Belgium international goalkeeper Simon Mignolet for only one million more, they chose not to continue their pursuit of Butez. Later, negotiations with Monaco, who wanted to send him on loan to Cercle Brugge if he signed, also broke down due to the high transfer price. The price had been set high because Mouscron had to share half of the transfer fee with Lille.

Antwerp
On 12 June 2020, it was announced that Butez had signed with Antwerp, where he was set to succeed Sinan Bolat, whose contract was not renewed. The transfer fee was deemed to be around €2 million. Mouscron refused an offer of €1 million not long before.

Butez made his debut for Antwerp on 8 August 2020 in the league match against his former club Mouscron. In January 2021, he was sidelined with an ankle injury, after which he was replaced by first Alireza Beiranvand and since Ortwin De Wolf, who had been loaned during the January transfer window. At the start of the play-offs, however, manager Frank Vercauteren again opted for Butez as the starter.

References

External links
 

1995 births
Living people
Association football goalkeepers
French footballers
Lille OSC players
Royal Excel Mouscron players
Royal Antwerp F.C. players
Belgian Pro League players
French expatriate footballers
French expatriate sportspeople in Belgium
Expatriate footballers in Belgium